The 2017 WNBA season is the 21st season for the Los Angeles Sparks of the Women's National Basketball Association. The Sparks are the defending WNBA champions. The season tipped off on May 13. The Sparks finished 26–8 with the number 2 seed in the league and advanced all the way to the Finals for the second season in a row, setting up a rematch with the Minnesota Lynx, but would lose this time in 5 games, failing to win back-to-back championships.

Transactions
 Alana Beard resigned with Los Angeles Sparks 
 Sandrine Gruda signed with the team on July 28, 2017.

WNBA Draft

Roster

Game log

Preseason

|- style="background:#fcc;"
| 1
| May 2
| New York
| L 65-81
| Samuelson (9)
| Wiese (6)
| Tied (2)
| Mohegan Sun Arena  2,782
| 0-1
|- style="background:#fcc;"
| 2
| May 3
| Connecticut
| L 62-79
| Sims (12)
| Warley-Talbert (11)
| Sims (5)
| Mohegan Sun Arena  2,809
| 0-2
|- style="background:#bbffbb;"
| 3
| May 6
| San Antonio
| W 73-59
| Ruef (18)
| Ruef (7)
| Gray (5)
| Pasadena College  1,000
| 1-2

Regular season 

|- style="background:#bbffbb;"
| 1
| May 13
| Seattle
| W 78-68
| Ogwumike (23)
| Jackson (8)
| Gray (8)
| Staples Center  10,603
| 1-0
|- style="background:#bbffbb;"
| 2
| May 19
| Washington
| W 99-89
| Ogwumike (23)
| Parker (8)
| Parker (5)
| Staples Center  12,127
| 2-0
|- style="background:#fcc;"
| 3
| May 24
| Indiana
| L 90-93
| Ogwumike (24)
| Parker (12)
| Parker (6)
| Bankers Life Fieldhouse  5,875
| 2-1
|- style="background:#fcc;"
| 4
| May 27
| Atlanta
| L 73-75
| Gray (25)
| Ogwumike (7)
| Parker (6)
| McCamish Pavilion  4,253
| 2-2
|- style="background:#bbffbb;"
| 5
| May 30
| New York
| W 90-75
| Ogwumike (22)
| Parker (11)
| Gray (6)
| Madison Square Garden  8,108
| 3-2

|- style="background:#bbffbb;"
| 6
| June 6
| Chicago
| W 79-70
| Ogwumike (20)
| Ogwumike (11)
| Gray (5)
| Staples Center  8,523
| 4-2
|- style="background:#fcc;"
| 7
| June 9
| Dallas
| L 90-96
| Ogwumike (28)
| Ogwumike (13)
| Sims (5)
| College Park Center  3,169
| 4-3
|- style="background:#bbffbb;"
| 8
| June 10
| Phoenix
| W 89-87
| Gray (24)
| Tied (5)
| Gray (8)
| Talking Stick Resort Arena  10,223
| 5-3
|- style="background:#bbffbb;"
| 9
| June 13
| Dallas
| W 97-87
| Gray (24)
| Parker (7)
| Tied (5)
| Staples Center  7,233
| 6-3
|- style="background:#bbffbb;"
| 10
| June 15
| San Antonio
| W 80-75
| Parker (20)
| Ogwumike (9)
| Parker (4)
| Staples Center  9,104
| 7-3
|- style="background:#bbffbb;"
| 11
| June 18
| Phoenix
| W 90-57
| Ogwumike (18)
| Parker (8)
| Parker (6)
| Staples Center  9,916
| 8-3
|- style="background:#bbffbb;"
| 12
| June 24
| Indiana
| W 84-73
| Ogwumike (21)
| Parker (13)
| Parker (7)
| Bankers Life Fieldhouse  9,241
| 9-3
|- style="background:#bbffbb;"
| 13
| June 27
| Connecticut
| W 87-79
| Ogwumike (21)
| Ogwumike (9)
| Gray (5)
| Mohegan Sun Arena  6,899
| 10-3
|- style="background:#bbffbb;"
| 14
| June 30
| Atlanta
| W 85-76
| Parker (21)
| Parker (13)
| Parker (5)
| McCamish Pavilion  4,119
| 11-3

|- style="background:#bbffbb;"
| 15
| July 2
| Washington
| W 76-69
| Tied 17
| Parker (11)
| Parker (4)
| Staples Center  9,185
| 12-3
|- style="background:#fcc;"
| 16
| July 6
| Minnesota
| L 77-88
| Ogwumike (27)
| Ogwumike (14)
| Ogwumike (5)
| Xcel Energy Center  9,821
| 12-4
|- style="background:#fcc;"
| 17
| July 8
| Seattle
| L 69-81
| Ogwumike (21)
| Ogwumike (9)
| Gray (6)
| KeyArena  7,104
| 1125
|- style="background:#bbffbb;"
| 18
| July 13
| Connecticut
| W 87-77
| Ogwumike (29)
| Ogwumike (11)
| Parker (6)
| Staples Center  9,918
| 13-5
|- style="background:#bbffbb;"
| 19
| July 17
| Indiana
| W 80-62
| Gray (16)
| Ogwumike (12)
| Ogwumike (6)
| Staples Center  11,386
| 14-5
|- style="background:#fcc;"
| 20
| July 20
| Chicago
| L 80-82
| Ogwumike (24)
| Ogwumike (10)
| Gray (6)
| Staples Center  16,166
| 14-6
|- style="background:#bbffbb;"
| 21
| July 25
| Seattle
| W 68-60
| Parker (17)
| Tied (10)
| Gray (5)
| Staples Center  10,012
| 15-6
|- style="background:#bbffbb;"
| 22
| July 28
| San Antonio
| W 85-73
| Sims (22)
| Parker (17)
| Parker (11)
| AT&T Center  5,777
| 16-6
|- style="background:#bbffbb;"
| 23
| July 30
| Dallas
| W 95-74
| Parker (23)
| Parker (10)
| Tied (8)
| Staples Center  11,053
| 17-6

|- style="background:#bbffbb;"
| 24
| August 4
| New York
| W 87-84
| Parker (24)
| Gray (7)
| Parker (6)
| Staples Center  11,617
| 18-6
|- style="background:#fcc;"
| 25
| August 6
| Dallas
| L 79-85
| Tied (21)
| Parker (9)
| Gray (4)
| College Park Center  3,903
| 18-7
|- style="background:#bbffbb;"
| 26
| August 11
| Minnesota
| W 70-64
| Gray (23)
| Parker (10)
| Sims (5)
| Xcel Energy Center  11,533
| 19-7
|- style="background:#fcc;"
| 27
| August 13
| New York
| L 69-83
| Sims (18)
| Parker (7)
| Sims (5)
| Madison Square Garden  10,083
| 19-8
|- style="background:#bbffbb;"
| 28
| August 16
| Washington
| W 95-62
| Parker (21)
| Parker (7)
| Sims (7)
| Capital One Arena  7,279
| 20-8
|- style="background:#bbffbb;"
| 29
| August 18
| Chicago
| W 115-106
| Ogwumike (32)
| Parker (12)
| Tied (10)
| Allstate Arena  6,826
| 21-8
|- style="background:#bbffbb;"
| 30
| August 22
| San Antonio
| W 75-55
| Ogwumike (22)
| Ogwumike (14)
| Parker (6)
| Staples Center  12,433
| 22-8
|- style="background:#bbffbb;"
| 31
| August 24
| Phoenix
| W 82-67
| Sims (28)
| Ogwumike (10)
| Sims (8)
| Talking Stick Resort Arena  9,890
| 23-8
|- style="background:#bbffbb;"
| 32
| August 27
| Minnesota
| W 78-67
| Parker (24)
| Parker (10)
| Gray (5)
| Staples Center  19,282
| 24-8

|- style="background:#bbffbb;"
| 33
| September 1
| Atlanta
| W 81-56
| Parker (18)
| Ogwumike (6)
| Sims (7)
| Staples Center  12,163
| 25-8
|- style="background:#bbffbb;"
| 34
| September 3
| Connecticut
| W 81-70
| Ogwumike (21)
| Parker (14)
| Gray (7)
| Staples Center  12,236
| 26-8

Playoffs

|- style="background:#bbffbb;"
| 1
| September 12
| Phoenix
| W 79–66
| Ogwumike (19)
| Ogwumike (9)
| Gray (6)
| Staples Center  7,963
| 1–0
|- style="background:#bbffbb;"
| 2
| September 14
| Phoenix
| W 86–72
| Parker (24)
| Parker (13)
| Tied (6)
| Walter Pyramid   4,023
| 2–0
|- style="background:#bbffbb;"
| 3
| September 17
| Phoenix
| W 89–87
| Sims (22)
| Ogwumike (12)
| Parker (11)
| Talking Stick Resort Arena   12,043
| 3–0

|- style="background:#bbffbb;"
| 1
| September 24
| Minnesota
| W 85–84
| Gray (27)
| Parker (11)
| Gray (6)
| Williams Arena  11,823
| 1–0
|- style="background:#ffcccc;"
| 2
| September 26
| Minnesota
| L 70–68
| Parker (17)
| Ogwumike (13)
| Parker (6)
| Williams Arena   11,434
| 1–1
|- style="background:#bbffbb;"
| 3
| September 29
| Minnesota
| W 75–64
| Tied (16)
| Ogwumike (10)
| Gray (7)
| Staples Center  13,500
| 2–1
|- style="background:#ffcccc;"
| 4
| October 1
| Minnesota
| L 69–80
| Ogwumike (17)
| Tied (8)
| Gray (9)
| Staples Center  13,500
| 2–2
|- style="background:#ffcccc;"
| 5
| October 4
| Minnesota
| L 76-85
| Parker (19)
| Parker (15)
| Gray (8)
| Williams Arena  14,632
| 2-3

Standings

Playoffs

Awards and honors

References

External links

Los Angeles Sparks seasons
Los Angeles
Los Angeles Sparks